Leptobrachium leucops is a species of frog in the family Megophryidae. This toad was discovered in Bidoup Núi Bà National Park in Lâm Đồng Province, Central Highlands region of Vietnam by a group of American, Australian and Vietnamese scientists. The specific name leucops refer to its partly white pupils. It is sometimes known as the yin-yang frog.

Leptobrachium leucops was found at the altitude of around 1500–1900 m above sea level.

References

leucops
Amphibians of Vietnam
Endemic fauna of Vietnam
Amphibians described in 2011
Taxa named by Jodi Rowley